The 2013 Nagoya Grampus season was Nagoya Grampus' 21st season in the J. League Division 1 and 31st overall in the Japanese top flight. It was Dragan Stojković last season as manager, as he left at the end of the season, and they finsed 11th in the J League, reached the group stage of the J. League Cup and were knocked out of the Emperor's Cup at the second round stage by Nagano Parceiro.

Squad
As of January 26, 2013

Out on loan

Transfers

Winter

In:

Out:

Summer

In:

Out:

Competitions

Friendlies

J.League

Results summary

Results by round

Results

League table

J.League Cup

Emperor's Cup

Squad statistics

Appearances and goals

|-
|colspan="14"|Players who left Nagoya Grampus during the season:

Goal Scorers

Disciplinary record

References
2013 J.League Division 1 Fixture

Nagoya Grampus
Nagoya Grampus seasons